Denis Vieru (born 10 March 1996) is a Moldovan judoka who competes in the men's half-lightweight 66 kg category. He competed in the men's 66 kg event at the 2020 Summer Olympics in Tokyo, Japan.

Career
He first rose to prominence after winning a gold medal at the European U-23 Judo Championships in 2016, the first Moldovan to do so since Marcel Trudov in 2005. Vieru won medals at a number of IJF Grand Prix and Grand Slam events in 2019, including Moldova's first Judo Grand Prix gold medal at the Antalya Grand Prix, another gold at the Baku Grand Slam, and defeated 2016 European champion Vazha Margvelashvili to win gold at the Grand Slam Paris. He also defeated Ranto Katsura of Japan to win a gold medal at the 2019 Summer Universiade in Naples, where he was the flag bearer for the Moldovan delegation in the opening ceremony, and won a bronze medal at the 2019 World Judo Championships. Vieru's medal as well as his points from the 2019 summer's competitions were suspended for a while, while the Moldovan was investigated for use of doping. However, Vieru and his advocates were able to prove that there was "neither will to doping, nor negligence" on the athlete's part, which meant that Vieru only received a three month suspension instead of the regular two years, and was able to keep his medal and his world ranking points. The documents about the events have been sealed from the public.

At the 2021 Judo Grand Slam Abu Dhabi held in Abu Dhabi, United Arab Emirates, he won the gold medal in his event. He won the gold medal in his event at the 2022 Judo Grand Prix Almada held in Almada, Portugal.

References

External links
 
 

1996 births
European Games competitors for Moldova
Judoka at the 2019 European Games
Living people
Moldovan male judoka
Sportspeople from Chișinău
Universiade gold medalists for Moldova
Universiade medalists in judo
Medalists at the 2019 Summer Universiade
Judoka at the 2020 Summer Olympics
Olympic judoka of Moldova
21st-century Moldovan people